Disney Channel was a South Korean pay television channel owned by Disney Channels Korea Ltd., a joint venture between The Walt Disney Company (Korea) LLC and the Disney Branded Television unit of Disney International Operations. The South Korean version of Disney Channel, which is separated from the pan-Asian version which was available in the country with Korean subtitles from June 1, 2002, until June 30, 2011.

History
On June 1, 2002, it started broadcasting with Korean subtitles on-screen of Disney Channel Asia. Then in May 2010, Disney Channel Worldwide (now Disney Branded Television in 2020) and SK Telecom joined to establish Television Media Korea Ltd. (now Disney Channels Korea in 2016), a joint venture, and on July 1, 2011, it started broadcasting Korean dubbing and voice multi-service through its own channel.

On November 2, 2011, SK Telecom physically spin-off its platform business, including TV Media Korea, into its new subsidiary, SK Planet. After that, SK Planet sold all of its stock in TV Media Korea to The Walt Disney Company Korea, a Korean corporation of The Walt Disney Company, on September 30, 2015. As a result, Disney directly operates the Disney Channel and its sister channel, Disney Junior.

Closure
On July 4, 2021, a report said Disney Channel and Disney Junior would cease transmission at the end of September to select and focus ahead of the launch of Disney+ in South Korea on November 12, 2021.

On August 25, 2021, MediaLog, a subsidiary of LG Uplus, a release partner of Disney+ in South Korea, acquired Disney Channel. Disney Channel and Disney Junior ceased transmission at midnight on September 30, 2021, after airing the last episode of Milo Murphy's Law and Cuby Zoo, respectively. At the same time as the closure, some TV providers, including LG Uplus’ U+ TV and its cable subsidiary LG HelloVision, replaced Disney Channel with MediaLog's new children's channel, The Kids.

Programming

See also
Tooniverse
Nickelodeon
Cartoon Network

References

External links
 

South Korea
Children's television networks
Children's television channels in South Korea
Korean-language television stations
Television channels in South Korea
Television channels and stations established in 2011
Television channels and stations disestablished in 2021
2011 establishments in South Korea